In mathematics, a distinctive feature of algebraic geometry is that some line bundles on a projective variety can be considered "positive", while others are "negative" (or a mixture of the two). The most important notion of positivity is that of an ample line bundle, although there are several related classes of line bundles. Roughly speaking, positivity properties of a line bundle are related to having many global sections. Understanding the ample line bundles on a given variety X amounts to understanding the different ways of mapping X into projective space. In view of the correspondence between line bundles and divisors (built from codimension-1 subvarieties), there is an equivalent notion of an ample divisor.

In more detail, a line bundle is called basepoint-free if it has enough sections to give a morphism to projective space. A line bundle is semi-ample if some positive power of it is basepoint-free; semi-ampleness is a kind of "nonnegativity". More strongly, a line bundle on X is very ample if it has enough sections to give a closed immersion (or "embedding") of X into projective space. A line bundle is ample if some positive power is very ample.

An ample line bundle on a projective variety X has positive degree on every curve in X. The converse is not quite true, but there are corrected versions of the converse, the Nakai–Moishezon and Kleiman criteria for ampleness.

Introduction

Pullback of a line bundle and hyperplane divisors
Given a morphism  of schemes, a vector bundle E on Y (or more generally a coherent sheaf on Y) has a pullback to X,  (see Sheaf of modules#Operations). The pullback of a vector bundle is a vector bundle of the same rank. In particular, the pullback of a line bundle is a line bundle.

The notions described in this article are related to this construction in the case of a morphism to projective space

with E = O(1) the line bundle on projective space whose global sections are the homogeneous polynomials of degree 1 (that is, linear functions) in variables . If f is a closed immersion, for example, it follows that the pullback  is the line bundle on X associated to a hyperplane section (the intersection of X with a hyperplane in ).

Basepoint-free line bundles
Let X be a scheme over a field k (for example, an algebraic variety) with a line bundle L. (A line bundle may also be called an invertible sheaf.) Then these sections define a morphism

In more detail: for each point x of U, the fiber of L over x is a 1-dimensional vector space over the residue field k(x). Choosing a basis for this fiber makes  into a sequence of n+1 numbers, not all zero, and hence a point in projective space. Changing the choice of basis scales all the numbers by the same nonzero constant, and so the point in projective space is independent of the choice.

Moreover, this morphism has the property that the restriction of L to U is isomorphic to the pullback .

The base locus of a line bundle L on a scheme X is the intersection of the zero sets of all global sections of L. A line bundle L is called basepoint-free if its base locus is empty. That is, for every point x of X there is a global section of L which is nonzero at x. If X is proper over a field k, then the vector space  of global sections has finite dimension; the dimension is called . Without making a choice, this can be described as the morphism

Conversely, for any morphism f from a scheme X to projective space  over k, the pullback line bundle  is basepoint-free. Therefore, for every point x in X, there is a section s of O(1) over  that is not zero at f(x), and the pullback of s is a global section of  that is not zero at x. In short, basepoint-free line bundles are exactly those that can be expressed as the pullback of O(1) by some morphism to projective space.

Nef, globally generated, semi-ample
The degree of a line bundle L on a proper curve C over k is defined as the degree of the divisor (s) of any nonzero rational section s of L. The coefficients of this divisor are positive at points where s vanishes and negative where s has a pole. Therefore, any line bundle L on a curve C such that  has nonnegative degree (because sections of L over C, as opposed to rational sections, have no poles). In particular, every basepoint-free line bundle on a curve has nonnegative degree. As a result, a basepoint-free line bundle L on any proper scheme X over a field is nef, meaning that L has nonnegative degree on every (irreducible) curve in X.

More generally, a sheaf F of -modules on a scheme X is said to be globally generated if there is a set I of global sections  such that the corresponding morphism

of sheaves is surjective. A line bundle is globally generated if and only if it is basepoint-free.

For example, every quasi-coherent sheaf on an affine scheme is globally generated. Analogously, in complex geometry, Cartan's theorem A says that every coherent sheaf on a Stein manifold is globally generated.

A line bundle L on a proper scheme over a field is semi-ample if there is a positive integer r such that the tensor power  is basepoint-free. A semi-ample line bundle is nef (by the corresponding fact for basepoint-free line bundles).

Very ample line bundles
A line bundle L on a proper scheme X over a field k is said to be very ample if it is basepoint-free and the associated morphism

is a closed immersion. Here . Equivalently, L is very ample if X can be embedded into projective space of some dimension over k in such a way that L is the restriction of the line bundle O(1) to X. The latter definition is used to define very ampleness for a line bundle on a proper scheme over any commutative ring.

The name "very ample" was introduced by Alexander Grothendieck in 1961. Various names had been used earlier in the context of linear systems of divisors.

So L has positive degree on every curve in X (because every subvariety of projective space has positive degree).

Definitions 
A line bundle L on a proper scheme X over a commutative ring R is said to be ample if there is a positive integer r such that the tensor power  is very ample. In particular, a proper scheme over R has an ample line bundle if and only if it is projective over R. An ample line bundle on a proper scheme X over a field has positive degree on every curve in X, by the corresponding statement for very ample line bundles.

A Cartier divisor D on a proper scheme X over a field k is said to be ample if the corresponding line bundle O(D) is ample. (For example, if X is smooth over k, then a Cartier divisor can be identified with a finite linear combination of closed codimension-1 subvarieties of X with integer coefficients.)

On an arbitrary scheme X, Grothendieck defined a line bundle L to be ample if X is quasi-compact and for every point x in X there is a positive integer r and a section  such that s is nonzero at x and the open subscheme  is affine. For example, the trivial line bundle  is ample if and only if X is quasi-affine. The rest of this article will concentrate on ampleness on proper schemes over a field.

Weakening the notion of "very ample" to "ample" gives a flexible concept with a wide variety of different characterizations. A first point is that tensoring high powers of an ample line bundle with any coherent sheaf whatsoever gives a sheaf with many global sections. More precisely, a line bundle L on a proper scheme X over a field (or more generally over a Noetherian ring) is ample if and only if for every coherent sheaf F on X, there is an integer s such that the sheaf  is globally generated for all . Here s may depend on F.

Another characterization of ampleness, known as the Cartan–Serre–Grothendieck theorem, is in terms of coherent sheaf cohomology. Namely, a line bundle L on a proper scheme X over a field (or more generally over a Noetherian ring) is ample if and only if for every coherent sheaf F on X, there is an integer s such that

for all  and all . In particular, high powers of an ample line bundle kill cohomology in positive degrees. This implication is called the Serre vanishing theorem, proved by Jean-Pierre Serre in his 1955 paper Faisceaux algébriques cohérents.

Examples/Non-examples
 The trivial line bundle  on a projective variety X of positive dimension is basepoint-free but not ample. More generally, for any morphism f from a projective variety X to some projective space  over a field, the pullback line bundle  is always basepoint-free, whereas L is ample if and only if the morphism f is finite (that is, all fibers of f have dimension 0 or are empty).
In particular, this space is zero for d < 0. For , the morphism to projective space given by O(d) is

by

Therefore, O(d) is basepoint-free if and only if , and very ample if and only if . It follows that O(d) is ample if and only if .
 For an example where "ample" and "very ample" are different, let X be a smooth projective curve of genus 1 (an elliptic curve) over C, and let p be a complex point of X. Let O(p) be the associated line bundle of degree 1 on X. Then the complex vector space of global sections of O(p) has dimension 1, spanned by a section that vanishes at p. So the base locus of O(p) is equal to p. Therefore, O(p) is ample but not very ample. Also, O(2p) is ample and basepoint-free but not very ample; the associated morphism to projective space is a ramified double cover .
 On curves of higher genus, there are ample line bundles L for which every global section is zero. (But high multiples of L have many sections, by definition.) For example, let X be a smooth plane quartic curve (of degree 4 in ) over C, and let p and q be distinct complex points of X. Then the line bundle  is ample but has .

Criteria for ampleness of line bundles

Intersection theory

To determine whether a given line bundle on a projective variety X is ample, the following numerical criteria (in terms of intersection numbers) are often the most useful. It is equivalent to ask when a Cartier divisor D on X is ample, meaning that the associated line bundle O(D) is ample. The intersection number  can be defined as the degree of the line bundle O(D) restricted to C. In the other direction, for a line bundle L on a projective variety, the first Chern class  means the associated Cartier divisor (defined up to linear equivalence), the divisor of any nonzero rational section of L.

On a smooth projective curve X over an algebraically closed field k, a line bundle L is very ample if and only if  for all k-rational points x,y in X. Let g be the genus of X. By the Riemann–Roch theorem, every line bundle of degree at least 2g + 1 satisfies this condition and hence is very ample. As a result, a line bundle on a curve is ample if and only if it has positive degree.

For example, the canonical bundle  of a curve X has degree 2g − 2, and so it is ample if and only if . The curves with ample canonical bundle form an important class; for example, over the complex numbers, these are the curves with a metric of negative curvature. The canonical bundle is very ample if and only if  and the curve is not hyperelliptic.

The Nakai–Moishezon criterion (named for Yoshikazu Nakai (1963) and Boris Moishezon (1964)) states that a line bundle L on a proper scheme X over a field is ample if and only if  for every (irreducible) closed subvariety Y of X (Y is not allowed to be a point). In terms of divisors, a Cartier divisor D is ample if and only if  for every (nonzero-dimensional) subvariety Y of X. For X a curve, this says that a divisor is ample if and only if it has positive degree. For X a surface, the criterion says that a divisor D is ample if and only if its self-intersection number  is positive and every curve C on X has .

Kleiman's criterion
To state Kleiman's criterion (1966), let X be a projective scheme over a field. Let  be the real vector space of 1-cycles (real linear combinations of curves in X) modulo numerical equivalence, meaning that two 1-cycles A and B are equal in  if and only if every line bundle has the same degree on A and on B. By the Néron–Severi theorem, the real vector space  has finite dimension. (This is slightly stronger than saying that L has positive degree on every curve.) Equivalently, a line bundle is ample if and only if its class in the dual vector space  is in the interior of the nef cone.

Kleiman's criterion fails in general for proper (rather than projective) schemes X over a field, although it holds if X is smooth or more generally Q-factorial.

A line bundle on a projective variety is called strictly nef if it has positive degree on every curve . and David Mumford constructed line bundles on smooth projective surfaces that are strictly nef but not ample. This shows that the condition  cannot be omitted in the Nakai–Moishezon criterion, and it is necessary to use the closure of NE(X) rather than NE(X) in Kleiman's criterion. Every nef line bundle on a surface has , and Nagata and Mumford's examples have .

C. S. Seshadri showed that a line bundle L on a proper scheme over an algebraically closed field is ample if and only if there is a positive real number ε such that deg(L|C) ≥ εm(C) for all (irreducible) curves C in X, where m(C) is the maximum of the multiplicities at the points of C.

Several characterizations of ampleness hold more generally for line bundles on a proper algebraic space over a field k. In particular, the Nakai-Moishezon criterion is valid in that generality. The Cartan-Serre-Grothendieck criterion holds even more generally, for a proper algebraic space over a Noetherian ring R. (If a proper algebraic space over R has an ample line bundle, then it is in fact a projective scheme over R.) Kleiman's criterion fails for proper algebraic spaces X over a field, even if X is smooth.

Openness of ampleness
(An R-divisor is defined to be ample if it can be written as a positive linear combination of ample Cartier divisors.) An elementary special case is: for an ample divisor H and any divisor E, there is a positive real number b such that  is ample for all real numbers a of absolute value less than b. In terms of divisors with integer coefficients (or line bundles), this means that nH + E is ample for all sufficiently large positive integers n.

Ampleness is also an open condition in a quite different sense, when the variety or line bundle is varied in an algebraic family. Namely, let  be a proper morphism of schemes, and let L be a line bundle on X. Then the set of points y in Y such that L is ample on the fiber  is open (in the Zariski topology).

Kleiman's other characterizations of ampleness
Kleiman also proved the following characterizations of ampleness, which can be viewed as intermediate steps between the definition of ampleness and numerical criteria. Namely, for a line bundle L on a proper scheme X over a field, the following are equivalent:
 L is ample.
 For every (irreducible) subvariety  of positive dimension, there is a positive integer r and a section  which is not identically zero but vanishes at some point of Y.
 For every (irreducible) subvariety  of positive dimension, the holomorphic Euler characteristics of powers of L on Y go to infinity:

Generalizations

Ample vector bundles
Robin Hartshorne defined a vector bundle F on a projective scheme X over a field to be ample if the line bundle  on the space  of hyperplanes in F is ample.

Several properties of ample line bundles extend to ample vector bundles. For example, a vector bundle F is ample if and only if high symmetric powers of F kill the cohomology  of coherent sheaves for all .

Big line bundles

A useful weakening of ampleness, notably in birational geometry, is the notion of a big line bundle. A line bundle L on a projective variety X of dimension n over a field is said to be big if there is a positive real number a and a positive integer  such that  for all .

There are several other characterizations of big line bundles. Also, a line bundle L is big if and only if it has a positive tensor power which is the tensor product of an ample line bundle A and an effective line bundle B (meaning that ).

Bigness can be viewed as a birationally invariant analog of ampleness. For example, if  is a dominant rational map between smooth projective varieties of the same dimension, then the pullback of a big line bundle on Y is big on X. (At first sight, the pullback is only a line bundle on the open subset of X where f is a morphism, but this extends uniquely to a line bundle on all of X.) For ample line bundles, one can only say that the pullback of an ample line bundle by a finite morphism is ample.

Example: Let X be the blow-up of the projective plane  at a point over the complex numbers. Then the divisor H + E is big but not ample (or even nef) on X, because

This negativity also implies that the base locus of H + E (or of any positive multiple) contains the curve E. In fact, this base locus is equal to E.

Relative ampleness 
Given a quasi-compact morphism of schemes , an invertible sheaf L on X is said to be ample relative to f or f-ample if the following equivalent conditions are met:
 f is quasi-separated and there is an open immersion  induced by the adjunction map:
.
 The condition 2. without "open".

See also

General algebraic geometry
 Algebraic geometry of projective spaces
 Fano variety: a variety whose canonical bundle is anti-ample
 Matsusaka's big theorem
 Divisorial scheme: a scheme admitting an ample family of line bundles

Ampleness in complex geometry
 Holomorphic vector bundle
 Kodaira embedding theorem: on a compact complex manifold, ampleness and positivity coincide.
 Kodaira vanishing theorem
 Lefschetz hyperplane theorem: an ample divisor in a complex projective variety X is topologically similar to X.

Notes

Sources

.
.
.
.
.

.

External links
 The Stacks Project

Algebraic geometry
Geometry of divisors
Vector bundles